Rossetta may refer to:
 a synonym for the Italian wine grape variety Rossignola
 a frazione of Bagnacavallo, Italy
 a place in the Mpofana Local Municipality, South Africa

See also
 Rosetta (disambiguation)